Stefan Sinovec (born June 20, 1988) is a Serbian professional basketball player for Šibenka of the Croatian League.

Pro career
Sinovec grew up with Ušće Vizura Belgrade juniors and made his debut with Vizura during the 2005–06 season. He played there till February 2009, when he moved to Ukraine and signed for the remainder of the season by Khimik.

He returned to Serbia for the 2009–10 season and signed with Partizan. For the 2010–11 season he moved to Metalac Valjevo. In 2011 he goes to Radnički Kragujevac.

In July 2013, he signed a one-year deal with the Macedonian club MZT Skopje and won the Macedonian League and Macedonian Cup. In June 2014, he signed with Szolnoki Olaj KK of Hungary for the 2014–15 season. In December 2014, he left Szolnoki and signed with his former team MZT Skopje. For the 2015–16 season he moved to Krka.

In October 2016, Sinovec returned to MZT Skopje for the 2016–17 season.

On September 4, 2017, Sinovec signed with Mega Bemax.

On March 19, 2018, he left Mega Bemax and signed with MZT Skopje.

In August 2020, Sinovec signed a one-year contract with Hungarian club Kaposvári KK that plays in the NB I/A. In January 2021, he signed back to Metalac. 

In March 2022, he signed for GKK Šibenka for the rest of the 2021–22 season.

References

External links
 Stefan Sinovec at aba-liga.com
 Stefan Sinovec at euroleague.net

1988 births
Living people
ABA League players
Basketball players from Belgrade
Basketball League of Serbia players
BC Khimik players
BC Lietkabelis players
GKK Šibenik players
KK Borac Zemun players
KK Krka players
KK Mega Basket players
KK Metalac Valjevo players
KK MZT Skopje players
KK Partizan players
KK Radnički Kragujevac (2009–2014) players
KK Vizura players
Kaposvári KK players
Serbian expatriate basketball people in Croatia
Serbian expatriate basketball people in Hungary
Serbian expatriate basketball people in Lithuania
Serbian expatriate basketball people in North Macedonia
Serbian expatriate basketball people in Russia
Serbian expatriate basketball people in Slovenia
Serbian men's basketball players
Shooting guards
Szolnoki Olaj KK players